Mangifera lalijiwa is a species of plant in the family Anacardiaceae. It is native to Java and the Lesser Sunda Islands. It is threatened by habitat loss.

References

lalijiwa
Flora of Java
Flora of the Lesser Sunda Islands
Data deficient plants
Taxonomy articles created by Polbot
Taxa named by André Joseph Guillaume Henri Kostermans